Arthur Edward Hodgkinson (1913- 1995)  was an Anglican priest, most notably Provost of St Andrew's Cathedral, Aberdeen from 1965 until  1978.

Hodgkinson was born on 29 October 1913 and educated at Edinburgh Theological College. He was ordained in 1940. After curacies in Glasgow and Perth, he was Priest in charge of Lochgelly from 1947 to 1954. He was then Rector of Motherwell from 1954 until his appointment as Provost.

He died on 19 April 1995.

References

1913 births
Alumni of Edinburgh Theological College
Provosts of St Andrew's Cathedral, Aberdeen
1995 deaths